Invergordon (or ) is a town and port in Easter Ross, in Ross and Cromarty, Highland, Scotland. It lies in the parish of Rosskeen.

History

The town built up around the harbour which was established in 1828. The area became a police burgh in 1863 and Invergordon Town Hall was completed in 1871.

The Invergordon Grain Distillery, operated by Philippines-owned whisky giant Whyte & Mackay, was established in 1959. Connected to the distillery was the Invergordon Distillery Pipe Band which was formed in 1964.

In 1971, the British Aluminium Company, which was 47% owned by Reynolds Metals, opened an aluminum smelter at Invergordon.

Naval Base
The naval institute was designed in 1914 by Edinburgh architect Stewart Kaye in anticipation of the First World War. The naval base was the venue for the Invergordon Mutiny of 1931. Remains of the naval base are evidenced in the tank farm lying behind the town centre; the port used to contain fuel oil and water supplies for naval ships (see Inchindown oil tanks).

One German bomb hit one of the tanks during the Second World War when a large flying boat base occupied much of the northerly coast of the Cromarty Firth. The naval base closed in 1956. On 27–28 May 1957 the Royal Navy held a fleet review in the waters off the town.

Since 1978, the former naval base has been used as a deep water port which has been visited by many large cruise liners and allows disembarkation for coach tours in the northern Highlands. The port renewed its military connections in the summer of 2017, when it was visited by the new aircraft carrier HMS Queen Elizabeth during her sea trials. On 19 June 2021 the last of the Batch-2 River-class offshore patrol vessel, HMS Spey, was commissioned at a ceremony at the former naval base. The Royal Marines Band Service was at the ceremony providing musical support.

Culture
Invergordon is now the premier mural town of the Highlands and hopes to emulate the success of her mentor in Chemainus, British Columbia. Currently the town is adorned with a series of 17 murals. The paintwork created by a selection of artists tells the stories of the local community and the area.  This trail is a result of a community project which was initially designed to integrate local community groups (17 in total took part). The trail, which was opened by the Princess Royal, now acts as a major tourist draw.

Infrastructure

The town is served by Invergordon railway station which lies on the Far North Line, and is in close proximity to the A9 trunk road.

As of 2012, there is a controversial scheme for a waste incinerator at the Cromarty Firth Industrial Park in Invergordon, which the Scottish government are now reviewing following protests by the local community. The £43 million plant would be built by Combined Power and Heat (Highlands) Ltd.

Education
Invergordon has one secondary school, Invergordon Academy, which is fed by four primary schools, Newmore Primary School, Park Primary School, South Lodge Primary School and Milton Primary School.

In 2013 the Highland Council announced plans for a new "super school" to serve Ross-shire with the preferred option being that it be built in Invergordon. This has seen much protest by locals and is currently under review. If it went ahead Alness and Tain academies would close and there would also be a change to the local primary schools.

In popular culture
In Season 3 of Amazon Prime motoring series The Grand Tour, Jeremy Clarkson, James May and Richard Hammond visited Invergordon as part of their journey along the NC500.

Notable residents
 Jimmy Andrews, footballer
 Robert Brough. painter.
 John D. Burgess, piper.
 Allan Cameron, curler
 Bryan Gunn, footballer
 James MacBain, Australian politician
 Rob MacLean, football commentator.
 Admiral of the Fleet Sir John Julian Robertson Oswald 
 Cheryl Paul, newsreader
 Sir Charles Ross, inventor of the Ross Rifle
 William Ramsay Smith, doctor and activist for Indigenous Australian rights.
 David Sutherland, comic book artist and illustrator best known for illustrating comic strips in The Beano such as The Bash Street Kids from 1962 until his death in 2023 and Dennis the Menace and Gnasher from 1970–1998.
 Luke Stoltman. five-time winner of Scotland's Strongest Man, 2021 Europe's Strongest Man
 Tom Stoltman, winner of the 2021 World's Strongest Man competition.

References

External links
 Invergordon Community Online
 Invergordon Archive
 Invergordon News
 Cromarty Firth Port Authority
 Park Primary School
 Invergordon Academy
 Invergordon Football Club
 Invergordon Junior Football Club
 http://www.invergordonoffthewall.com

 
Populated places in Ross and Cromarty
Ports and harbours of Scotland
Royal Navy bases in Scotland
Towns in Highland (council area)